Cold Blood Warm Heart (天地男兒) is a 1996 Hong Kong crime thriller and romantic drama television series produced by TVB. The series had a total of 65 episodes, airing from 5 February to 26 April 1996 on TVB Jade.

Plot
Tsui Wing-pong (Adam Cheng) and Tsui Ka-lap (Gallen Lo) are adopted brothers. Wing-pong was sent to the Tsui family when he was very young because his biological father abandoned the family during a difficult period. Over the years, Wing-pong bears a deep grudge against his biological father, who is the owner of the Yip family bank. At the same time, the Yip family had a dark past and some dangerous secrets.

Lo Chi-kin (Julian Cheung) is the new head of Wing-pong's division at the police station. He has a sister Rebecca Lo Wai-fong (Christine Ng), for whom Wing-pong had an unrequited love. Chi-kin and his best friend Yip Sing-hong (Louis Koo) fall in love with Fong Hau-yung (Adia Chan), who works at the bank run by the Yip family and so was she. However, Chi-kin and Hau-yung were forced to give up on each other, due to some circumstances, and Chi-kin ends up marrying Cheung Suet-ying (Jessica Hsuan), who is actually in love with Wing-pong's brother, Tsui Ka-lap.

During one murder case, Wing-pong was falsely accused as the murderer and was sent to jail. Following his release, he discovered that his brother, Ka-lap, was the real murderer and was also involved in many other criminal activities. It was later revealed that Ka-lap had the backing of the Yip family to commit the crimes he did. Seeing that there is no other choice, Wing-pong embarked on a dangerous journey to capture Ka-lap and to investigate the dark secrets that the Yip family held, but not without the unforeseen consequences of the sacrifice that the major characters had to make.

Cast
Adam Cheng as Tsui Wing-pong (徐永邦), the main protagonist of the series, the adopted son of the Tsui family whom was abandoned by his father, banking tycoon Yip Sing, during his youth. Wing-pong was originally a police sergeant, but was later framed by his adopted brother, Tsui Ka-lap, for the murder of corrupt police superintendent Tai Shu-piu and was imprisoned. Wing-pong later successfully appealed and was released without charge, and afterwards, collaborates with his niece Yip Hiu-fung and nephew Yip Sing-hong to rescue Wah Yip Bank, counter-working against Ka-lap.
Gallen Lo as Tsui Ka-lap (徐家立), the main antagonist of the series, a senior police inspector and eldest son of the family. With the backing of Wing-pong's half brother, Yip Wing-cheung, Ka-lap frames Wing-pong for the murder of his superior officer, Tai Shu-piu, who had been scheming with Ka-lap and Wing-cheung to smuggle drugs. Ka-lap, who had been taken advantage by Wing-cheung the whole time, manages to sabotage the latter, and seizes half of the stocks of Wah Yip Bank, before murdering Wing-cheung.
Julian Cheung as Lo Chi-kin (羅子建), a senior police inspector and Wing-pong's superior officer. Chi-kin and Wing-pong originally disliked each other, but after the case of the murder of Wing-pong's half brother Yip Wing-kei where the two of them were suspended from duties, they settled their differences.
Louis Koo as Yip Sing-hong (葉承康), Wing-pong's nephew and Chi-kin's best friend. Sing-hong and Chi-kin both had a crush on Fong Hau-yung, and ends up dating her. However, Sing-hong breaks up with Hau-yung to protect her when he discovered the secret that his father, Yip Wing-cheung, was the culprit behind his uncle, Yip Wing-kei's abduction, and Sing-hon was also forced by Ka-lap to betray Wai Yip Bank.
Christine Ng as Rebecca Lo (羅惠芳), Chi-kin's older sister who is an instructor. She develops a relationship with Wing-pong and after a full of setbacks, eventually marries Wing-pong.
Adia Chan as Fong Hau-yung (方巧容), an employee working at Wah Yip bank. As a child, Hau-yung suffered from septal defect. Although Chi-kin and Sing-hong fell in love with Hau-yung at the same time, she loved the former.
Jessica Hsuan as Michelle Cheung (張雪凝), Tsui Ka-lap's ex-girlfriend who almost ends up marrying Lo Chi-kin, even though she is still very much in love with the former.

TVB dramas
1996 Hong Kong television series debuts
1996 Hong Kong television series endings
Hong Kong crime television series
Hong Kong romance television series
Serial drama television series
1990s Hong Kong television series
1990s romance television series